RollDaBeats (branded in lowercase, as rolldabeats, previously known as Tarzan) was an online music database dedicated to drum and bass and its various stylistic origins. It was launched in February 2005 by the original webmaster Thijs Engels, and web designer Tom "Haste" Johnson. According to the website, the database held over 100,000 tracks released by more than 20,000 artists.

History
RollDaBeats originally started as an offline database stored on Engels' computer, first as plain text and then later as an Excel worksheet. The database grew and after five years Engels decided to make the database available online. In late 2001 he launched Tarzan using the database compiled from his personal music collection. With the help of site visitors through the guestbook and forum, the database continued to expand in both detail and volume.

In 2005 the website was redesigned by Haste, one of the contributors from the Tarzan forum, and was relaunched as Rolldabeats in February with its own domain name. It is now co-owned by Engels and Haste and maintained by a small team of site moderators, and has subsequently collected information on over 100,000 tracks released by more than 20,000 artists.

The site was nominated twice for Best Website in the Dutch Drum 'n' Bass Awards of 2006–07, losing to DnBForum.nl on both occasions, and taking joint second with 3VOOR12 in the latter. It has also promoted a series of DJ mixes titled A Decade in the Mix by various members of the site staff which illustrate the development of drum and bass in the 1990s. The site held a fundraiser on 3 November 2007, hosted by London nightclub DiTch, featuring several live sets including DJ Bailey of BBC Radio 1Xtra.

Content
Rolldabeats provided information on artists, releases and record labels, such as catalogue numbers, track listings, release dates and cover artwork. The site owners later added features such as audio clips of tracks, and music videos. The site also had an active Internet forum for DJ mixes being posted, tracklistings, announcements and submitting database updates.

The site's content was collected in several different ways. Originally the database was compiled from Engels' personal music collection, and later extended from the collections of site moderators. Some of the data is also gathered from online research by the site staff. The site also gathers much of its information from visitors through the forum, as well as other means including social media, email and instant messaging, which was confirmed and added manually by a site moderator. Visitors, especially artists, DJs, passionate collectors and label owners, were openly encouraged to submit updates on any information that would have been missing or incorrect.

See also
Discogs
List of online music databases

References

External links
 – official site

Online music and lyrics databases
Dutch music websites